The Thornbury Hoard is a hoard of 11,460 copper alloy Roman coins, mainly radiates and nummi, dating from 260 to 348, found in the back garden of Ken Allen in Thornbury, South Gloucestershire, England while digging a pond in March 2004. It was described as the "third largest of its kind" found in Great Britain.

Discovery, treatment and valuation
The hoard was discovered by Ken Allen while digging a pond in his back garden.

For the most part, the coins were readily identified after drying and chemical treatment.

At an inquest, the Coroner declared the hoard Treasure and a valuation committee subsequently valued it at £40,000. Bristol City Museum and Art Gallery acquired the hoard, funded by the Heritage Lottery Fund, the Headley Museums Treasure Acquisition Scheme, and other organisational funding.

Items discovered

The hoard was said to be the "third largest of its kind" and consisted of 11,449 copper alloy nummi and 11 copper alloy radiates, the earliest dating from during the reign of Gallienus in 260; the latest being struck in 348, during the Constantinian dynasty. However, the vast majority were minted in the 330s and consisted of three reverse types showing "Gloria Exercitus", meaning "to the glory of the army" – either carrying a reverse design of "two soldiers with legionary standards" or commemorative types depicting the Roman capitals of Rome and Constantinople. Others commemorated the battle of Chrysopolis fought between Constantine I and Licinius: these coins depict Victory standing on the prow of a ship.

The find was compared in size and constitution to those of the Nether Compton (22,670 coins) and Bishopswood (17,548 coins) hoards, found in 1989 and 1895 respectively.

See also

 List of hoards in Britain

References

Treasure troves in England
Treasure troves of Roman Britain
History of Gloucestershire
Thornbury, Gloucestershire
2004 in England
2004 archaeological discoveries
Hoards from Roman Britain
Coin hoards